Rampal Singh may refer to:

 Rampal Singh (INC politician), Indian politician in the Madhya Pradesh Legislative Assembly
 Rampal Singh (Madhya Pradesh politician) (born 1956), Indian politician, belonging to Bhartiya Janata Party
 Rampal Singh (Uttar Pradesh politician) (born 1930), Indian politician, belonging to Bhartiya Janata Party

See also
 Rampal (disambiguation)
 List of people with surname Singh